The Benson Portland, Curio Collection by Hilton is a 287-room historic hotel building in downtown Portland, Oregon, United States.
It is owned and operated by Coast Hotels & Resorts. It was originally known as the New Oregon Hotel, and is commonly known as "The Benson". It has a reputation as one of Portland's finest hotels. The hotel is named after notable businessman and philanthropist Simon Benson. The Benson is the seventh largest hotel in Portland based on the number of rooms.

History

Simon Benson had wished to build a world-class hotel in Portland. During the population boom which occurred between the 1905 Lewis and Clark Centennial Exposition and the Great Depression, Benson fulfilled his wish.

The firm of Doyle, Patterson & Beach designed the main hotel building in French Second Empire style; Chicago's Blackstone Hotel served as an inspiration of the building's design.  The hotel opened on March 5, 1913 as an annex to the adjacent Oregon Hotel, on the southern half of the block. It was known as the New Oregon Hotel for 16 months, then renamed The Benson Hotel after Benson took over management. 
Benson sold the hotel to William Boyd and Robert Keller in 1919. They, in turn, sold it to Seattle-based Western Hotels in 1944. In 1959, the old Oregon Hotel building next door was demolished by Western to make way for a 175-room annex to the 1912 building. Western International Hotels was renamed Westin Hotels in 1981, and the hotel became The Westin Benson.  The Westin Benson was added to the National Register of Historic Places in 1986. Westin Hotels sold the hotel to WestCoast Hotels (now Coast Hotels & Resorts) in 1988 and it returned to its original name.

El Gaucho Restaurant is on the ground floor of the building.

The Jimi Hendrix Experience drummer Mitch Mitchell died in his hotel room at the Benson Hotel on November 12, 2008.

On October 6, 2021, the hotel was rebranded as part of Curio Collection by Hilton, a division of Hilton Hotels.

References

Further reading
Benson, Alice Simon Benson, Northwest Lumber King (Portland, Ore.: Binford & Mort, 1976)
MacColl, E. Kimbark  Money, Merchants, and Power: The Portland Establishment, 1843-1913 (Portland, Ore.: Georgian Press, 1988)

External links

The Benson Portland, Curio Collection by Hilton official website
The Benson Portland, Curio Collection by Hilton official chain website

1912 establishments in Oregon
A. E. Doyle buildings
Hotel buildings completed in 1912
Hotel buildings on the National Register of Historic Places in Portland, Oregon
Hotels established in 1913
Southwest Portland, Oregon
Portland Historic Landmarks
Skyscraper hotels in Portland, Oregon